Carroll County Regional Airport , also known as Jack B. Poage Field, is a public airport located three miles (5 km) north of the central business district of Westminster, in Carroll County, Maryland, United States. The airport is owned by Carroll County Board of Commissioners. It is designated as a reliever airport for the Baltimore-Washington International Thurgood Marshall Airport (BWI).

Although most U.S. airports use the same three-letter location identifier for the FAA and IATA, Carroll County Regional Airport is assigned DMW by the FAA but has no designation from the IATA due to the small size of the airport and its main use being general aviation.

Facilities and aircraft 
The airport also has a flight school called Dream Flight School.

For the 12-month period ending May 2, 2006, the airport had 153,690 aircraft operations, an average of 421 per day: 99% general aviation, <1% air taxi and <1% military. There are 143 aircraft based at this airport: 85% single engine, 10% multi-engine, 4% jet aircraft and 1% helicopters.

There are currently no plans to bring commercial service to the airport. The nearest airport with commercial service is Baltimore BWI airport, serving flights to many US cities and with a few flights to/from Europe. 

The airport does not have air traffic control.

Amenities 
The airport is near MD-97. It is also located in the vicinity of Carroll County Pond. It is near a populated area of Carroll County.

Fatal airshow accident 

On September 23, 1990, 62-year-old pilot Jack B. Poage was killed when his red-and-white Pitts S-2B crashed into a grassy field near the main runway of the airport after he failed to leave enough altitude to recover from a flat-spin maneuver during his plane stunt. The field where he crashed was later named after him in his honor. The crash was caught on camera by a witness.

References

External links 
 Carroll County Regional Airport official website
 Carroll County Regional Airport Master Plan

Airports in Maryland
Transportation buildings and structures in Carroll County, Maryland
Westminster, Maryland